Michael Frayn, FRSL (born 8 September 1933) is an English playwright and novelist. He is best known as the author of the farce Noises Off and the dramas Copenhagen and  Democracy.  His novels, such as Towards the End of the Morning, Headlong and Spies, have also been critical and commercial successes, making him one of the handful of writers in the English language to succeed in both drama and prose fiction.  He has also written philosophical works, such as The Human Touch: Our Part in the Creation of the Universe (2006).

Early life
Frayn was born at Mill Hill (then in Middlesex) to Thomas Allen Frayn, an asbestos salesman from a working-class family of blacksmiths, locksmiths and servants, in which deafness was hereditary, and his wife Violet Alice (née Lawson). Violet was the daughter of a failed palliasse merchant; having studied as a violinist at the Royal Academy of Music, she worked as a shop assistant and occasional clothes model at Harrods. After the slump in asbestos prices, Frayn's sister supported the family by also working at Harrods, as a children's hairdresser. 

He grew up in Ewell, Surrey, and was educated at Kingston Grammar School. Following two years of National Service, during which he learned Russian at the Joint Services School for Linguists, Frayn read Moral Sciences (Philosophy) at Emmanuel College, Cambridge, graduating in 1957. He then worked as a reporter and columnist for The Guardian and The Observer, where he established a reputation as a satirist and comic writer, and began publishing his plays and novels.

Theatre Work
The play Copenhagen deals with a historical event, a 1941 meeting between the Danish physicist Niels Bohr and his protégé, the German Werner Heisenberg, when Denmark is under German occupation, and Heisenberg is—maybe?—working on the development of an atomic bomb. Frayn was attracted to the topic because it seemed to 'encapsulate something about the difficulty of knowing why people do what they do and
there is a parallel between that and the impossibility that Heisenberg established in physics, about ever knowing everything about the behaviour of physical objects'. The play explores various possibilities.

Frayn's more recent play Democracy ran successfully in London (the National Theatre, 2003-4 and West End transfer), Copenhagen and on Broadway (Brooks Atkinson Theatre, 2004-5); it dramatised the story of the German chancellor Willy Brandt and his personal assistant, the East German spy Günter Guillaume. Five years later, again at the National Theatre, it was followed by Afterlife, a biographical drama of the life of the great Austrian impresario Max Reinhardt, director of the Salzburg Festival, which opened at the Lyttelton Theatre in June 2008, starring Roger Allam as Reinhardt.

His other original plays include two evenings of short plays, The Two of Us and Alarms and Excursions, the philosophical comedies Alphabetical Order, Benefactors, Clouds, Make and Break and Here, and the farces Donkeys' Years, Balmoral (also known as Liberty Hall), and Noises Off, which critic Frank Rich in his book The Hot Seat claimed "is, was, and probably always will be the funniest play written in my lifetime."

Novels 
His novels include Headlong (shortlisted for the 1999 Booker Prize), The Tin Men (won the 1966 Somerset Maugham Award), The Russian Interpreter (1967, Hawthornden Prize) Towards the End of the Morning, Sweet Dreams, A Landing on the Sun, A Very Private Life, Now You Know and Skios (long-listed for the Man Booker Prize in 2012). His novel Spies was long-listed for the Man Booker Prize and won the Whitbread Prize for Fiction in 2002.

Non-Fiction 
He has written a book about philosophy, Constructions, and a book of his own philosophy, The Human Touch.

His columns for The Guardian and The Observer (collected in The Day of the Dog, The Book of Fub and On the Outskirts) are models of the comic essay; in the 1980s a number of them were adapted and performed for BBC Radio 4 by Martin Jarvis.

Frayn has also written screenplays for the films Clockwise, starring John Cleese, First and Last starring Tom Wilkinson, Birthday, Jamie on a Flying Visit, and the TV series Making Faces, starring Eleanor Bron.

Translation 
Frayn learned Russian during his period of National Service. Frayn is now considered to be Britain's finest translator of Anton Chekhov (The Seagull, Uncle Vanya, Three Sisters and The Cherry Orchard) as well as an early untitled work, which he titled Wild Honey (other translations of the work have called it Platonov or Don Juan in the Russian Manner) and a number of Chekhov's smaller plays for an evening called The Sneeze (originally performed on the West End by Rowan Atkinson).

Frayn also translated Yuri Trifonov's play Exchange, Leo Tolstoy's The Fruits of Enlightenment, and Jean Anouilh's Number One.

Television 
In 1980, he presented the Australian journey of the BBC television series Great Railway Journeys of the World. His journey took him from Sydney to Perth on the Indian Pacific, with side visits to the Lithgow Zig Zag and a journey on The Ghan's old route from Marree to Alice Springs shortly before the opening of the new line from Tarcoola to Alice Springs.

Personal Life 
Frayn's wife, Claire Tomalin, is a biographer and literary journalist.  They and their daughter Rebecca, an actress and filmmaker, live in Chiswick.

Awards

 1966: Somerset Maugham Award, for The Tin Men
 1975: London Evening Standard Award for Best Comedy, for Alphabetical Order
 1976: Laurence Olivier Award for Best Comedy, for Donkeys' Years*
 1980: London Evening Standard Award for Best Comedy for Make and Break
 1982: London Evening Standard Award for Best Comedy, for Noises Off
 1982: Laurence Olivier Award for Best Comedy, for Noises Off
 1984: London Evening Standard Award for Best Play, for Benefactors
 1986: New York Drama Critics' Circle Award for Best Foreign Play of the 1985–86 Season, for Benefactors
 1990: International Emmy Award, for First and Last
 1991: Sunday Express Book of the Year, for A Landing on the Sun
 1998: Critics' Circle Theatre Awards for Best New Play, for Copenhagen
 1998: London Evening Standard Award for Best Play, for Copenhagen
 2000: Tony Award for Best Play (USA), for Copenhagen
 2000: New York Drama Critics' Circle Award for Best Foreign Play of the 1999–2000 Season, for Copenhagen
 2002: Whitbread Best Novel Award, for Spies (the overall Whitbread Prize went to his wife, Claire Tomalin)
 2002: Bollinger Everyman Wodehouse Prize for Spies
 2003: Commonwealth Writers Prize for Best Book (Eurasia Region), for Spies
 2003: London Evening Standard Award for Best Play, for Democracy
 2003: Golden PEN Award for "a Lifetime's Distinguished Service to Literature".
 2005: Honorary DLitt from the University of Birmingham
 2006: St. Louis Literary Award from the Saint Louis University Library Associates
He is an honorary associate of the National Secular Society, and declined a CBE and a Knighthood in 1989 and 2003 respectively.

Bibliography

Novels
The Tin Men (1965)
The Russian Interpreter (1966)
Towards the End of the Morning (US title: Against Entropy) (1967)
A Very Private Life (1968)
Sweet Dreams (1973)
The Trick of It (1989)
A Landing on the Sun (1991)
Now You Know (1993)
 Headlong (1999)
Spies (2002)
Skios (2012)

Plays

Newly-written 

 The Two of Us, four one-act plays for two actors (1970) Black and Silver, Mr. Foot, Chinamen, and The new Quixote
 Alphabetical Order (1976)
 Donkeys' Years (1977)
 Clouds (1977)
 Balmoral (1978; revised 1980 as Liberty Hall, revised 1987)
 Make and Break (1980)
 Noises Off (1982)
 Benefactors (1984)
 The Sneeze (1988), based on short stories and plays of Chekhov
 First and Last (1989)
 Listen to This: Sketches and Monologues (1990)
 Jamie on a Flying Visit; and Birthday (1990)
 Look Look (1990)
 Audience (1991)
 Here (1993)
 La Belle Vivette, a version of Jacques Offenbach's La Belle Hélène (1995)
 Alarms and Excursions: More Plays than One (1998)
 Copenhagen (1998)
 Democracy (2003) 
 Afterlife (2008) 
 Matchbox Theatre: Thirty Short Entertainments (2014),

Translated 

 The Cherry Orchard, from Chekhov (1978)
 The Fruits of Enlightenment, from Tolstoy (1979)
 Three Sisters, from  Chekhov (1983, revised 1988)
 Number One, from Jean Anouilh's Le Nombril (1984)
 Wild Honey, from Chekhov (1984)
 The Seagull, from Chekhov (1986)
 Uncle Vanya, from Chekhov (1986)
 Exchange, adapted from Yuri Trifonov (1990)

Anthologies 

 Plays: One (1985),  – contains: Alphabetical Order; Donkey's Years; Clouds; Make and Break; Noises Off
 Plays: Two (1991),  – contains: Balmoral; Benefactors; Wild Honey
 Plays: Three (2000),  – contains: Here; Now You Know; La Belle Vivette
 Plays: Four (2010),  – contains: Copenhagen; Democracy; Afterlife

Short fiction
Speak After The Beep: Studies in the Art of Communicating With Inanimate and Semi-Animate Objects (1995).

Non-fiction
The Day of the Dog, articles reprinted from The Guardian (1962).
The Book of Fub, articles reprinted from The Guardian (1963).
On the Outskirts, articles reprinted from The Observer (1964).
At Bay in Gear Street, articles reprinted from The Observer (1967).
The Original Michael Frayn, a collection of the above four, plus 19 new Observer pieces.
Constructions, a volume of philosophy (1974).
Celia's Secret: An Investigation (US title The Copenhagen Papers ), with David Burke (2000).
The Human Touch: Our part in the creation of the universe (2006).
Stage Directions: Writing on Theatre, 1970–2008 (2008), his path into theatre and a collection of the introductions to his plays.
Travels with a Typewriter (2009), a collection of Frayn's travel pieces from the 1960s and '70s from The Guardian and the Observer.
My Father's Fortune: A Life (2010), a memoir of Frayn's childhood.

Notes

References
Theatre Record and its annual Indexes

External links

 
 Michael Frayn at the British Film Institute
 
 Profile on BBC Four (archived 2007-10-21)

 
Profile at United Agents
On Doollee

1933 births
Living people
20th-century British military personnel
20th-century English novelists
21st-century English novelists
Alumni of Emmanuel College, Cambridge
Emmy Award winners
English dramatists and playwrights
English male dramatists and playwrights
English male novelists
English republicans
Fellows of St Catherine's College, Oxford
Fellows of the Royal Society of Literature
Laurence Olivier Award winners
Military personnel from Middlesex
People educated at Kingston Grammar School
People from Mill Hill
Russian–English translators
Tony Award winners
People from Chiswick